Georges Kaiser (born 14 December 1942) is a Swiss middle-distance runner. He competed in the men's 3000 metres steeplechase at the 1972 Summer Olympics.

References

1942 births
Living people
Athletes (track and field) at the 1972 Summer Olympics
Swiss male middle-distance runners
Swiss male steeplechase runners
Olympic athletes of Switzerland
Place of birth missing (living people)